"Hands Up (Give Me Your Heart)" is a 1981 song by Ottawan. It was the band's second-biggest international hit single, after their 1979 hit "D.I.S.C.O.".

The song reached the Top 5 across Europe and became a number one in New Zealand.  It was not released in North America until 1991 as a remix.

There was a French version, called Haut les mains (donne moi ton cœur), whose translation is nearly the same as the English title.

Sway version
In 1987, Club Med commissioned a re-recording of the song to serve as the new commercial jingle for its television advertising. The new version was recorded by Sway, a one-off vocal group featuring Canadian musicians Vivienne Williams, Sharon Lee Williams and Colina Phillips on vocals, and was produced by reggae musician Carl Harvey.

The Sway version reached #7 on Canada's RPM charts in 1988, and was a Juno Award nominee for Best Single at the Juno Awards of 1989.

Other versions 
Argentine band  recorded a cover in Spanish called "Canta" in 1998.

Chart history

Weekly charts
Ottawan original

Year-end charts

Sway version

References

External links
 

1981 singles
1981 songs
Irish Singles Chart number-one singles
Number-one singles in New Zealand
Number-one singles in Norway
Number-one singles in Spain
Ottawan songs
Disco songs
Songs written by Daniel Vangarde
Songs written by Jean Kluger